Harling Road railway station is on the Breckland line in the east of England, serving the villages of Larling, Roudham and East Harling, Norfolk.

The station is managed by Greater Anglia, which also operates most of the services calling at the station. Some East Midlands Railway also stop at Harling Road.

History

The Bill for the Norwich & Brandon Railway (N&BR) received Royal Assent on 10 May 1844. Work started on the line in 1844 and the line and its stations were opened on 30 July 1845. . The line ran from Ely to Trowse, in Norwich. The link into Norwich was delayed due to the need to build a bridge over the River Wensum that kept the river navigable. One month before the N&BR opened a Bill authorising the amalgamation of the Yarmouth & Norwich Railway with the N&BR came into effect and so Harling station became a Norfolk Railway asset.

Description

A footpath links the station to the village.

Harling Road is a small station and until recently had remained largely outdated. The wooden level crossing gates adjacent to the station used to be opened and closed manually by a signaller in the Harling Road signal box. In December 2012 the signal box was closed and the crossing was renewed with automatic barriers with warning lights.

Passenger facilities are basic, with a car-park and seating in a shelter on the eastbound (Norwich) platform only. There is a bicycle shelter on the westbound (Cambridge) platform. There is no ticket office, and tickets may be bought from the conductor on the train.

Harling Road is located in a rural area, and is ideally placed to provide access to the countryside for those who can not, or do not wish to, make use of a car for transportation. There is easy access to several long-distance footpaths, including the Peddars Way, Angles Way, Icknield Way, Iceni Way and the Hereward Way. There are a number of other opportunities with Knettishall Heath, West Harling Heath and Wayland Wood (where the events that inspired the Babes in the Wood took place) all being within walking distance.

Services

On Saturday afternoons there are two westbound services to  via Cambridge, both operated by Greater Anglia.

There is no Sunday service.

References

External links 

Breckland District
Railway stations in Norfolk
Former Great Eastern Railway stations
Railway stations in Great Britain opened in 1845
Railway stations served by East Midlands Railway
Greater Anglia franchise railway stations